The Barents Observer is a Norwegian online newspaper which publishes news and op-ed content about the Barents Region. The newspaper is based in Kirkenes and is owned by its journalists. It receives financial support from the European Endowment for Democracy, the Nordic Council of Ministers, the Norwegian government, the Fritt Ord foundation, private companies, and individuals.

In March 2019, The Barents Observer was blocked for readers in Russia after having published an interview with a homosexual Sámi activist describing his suicidal thoughts. A member of the Russian State Duma supported the blocking, saying that the article expressed "degeneration and decay". The newspaper actively tries to bypass the blockade.

In 2022, The Barents Observer was offered a video showing a Norwegian diplomat complaining about a hotel room in Murmansk, using undiplomatic language. The paper chose to not publish the video, nor write about the case, as it appeared to come from Russian intelligence. The case was widely covered by other outlets.

References 

Newspapers published in Norway